Muhammad Abd-al-Rahman Barker (born Phillip Barker November 3, 1929 – March 16, 2012) was an American linguist who was professor of Urdu and South Asian Studies and created one of the first roleplaying games, Empire of the Petal Throne. He wrote several fantasy/science fantasy novels based in his associated world setting of Tékumel.

In 1991 he published a neo-Nazi novel under a pseudonym. Between 1990 and 2002, Barker also served as a member of the Editorial Advisory Committee which advocated holocaust denial.

Early life
Born in Spokane, Washington, descended from ancestors who had originally settled in America in 1626, Barker's childhood was spent around Washington and Idaho. As a youth he had an interest in "fairy stories, history and literature" which would be further influenced by such films as The Thief of Bagdad; all of which helped to turn his casual "wargames" with toy soldiers more towards fantasy. From this his fictional lands of Tsolyanu and others, in what was later to become Tékumel, emerged and were embellished further in middle and high school years during which time he commenced construction of armies of hand-carved figures to represent his creations. Also at an early age, Barker's interest in languages was piqued by neighboring children of Basque origin who were able to exclude others from their secret conversations in their native tongue.

Academic life and creative networking
In, and just before 1950, while Barker was studying at the University of Washington under Melville Jacobs, he became involved with small press publications, writing articles, short stories and contributing reviews to Fanscient and the local clubzine Sinisterra, the latter of which contained his review of, and content from, Jack Vance relating to his recently published book, The Dying Earth. Also at this time, Barker corresponded with other authors who contributed to those same publications, including Lin Carter in whose writings and linguistic experiments he took an interest and with whom he finally put to paper the story line of his own created world.

He received a Fulbright Scholarship in 1951 to study the languages of India and on his first trip to India that year converted to Islam "for purely theological reasons. It seemed like a more logical religion", according to Fine, although Barker himself admitted at the time to an "[unimaginable] feeling of awe and religious ecstasy" upon hearing the recitations of the 99 Names of Allah at the Taj Mahal.

Later academic studies and career
Barker attended the University of California, Berkeley for graduate studies, writing a dissertation on Klamath language, collecting traditional myths, legends, tales, and oral histories and later publishing a grammar and dictionary on the language.

He taught at the Institute of Islamic Studies at McGill University from around 1958/59 until 1972 and became active in the development of Urdu and Baluchi instruction materials for English-speaking students following a period of two years from 1960 when he was attached to Punjab University. Some of these were still recommended university course study materials as of 2010. From 1972 he moved to teach at the University of Minnesota in Minneapolis, where he chaired the Department of South Asian studies until his retirement in the early 1990s, a few years after that department was disbanded due to reduced funding.

Tékumel
While at Berkeley, Barker had not set aside his world creation project. Indeed, despite stepping back from an active role in the science fiction fandom, he had commenced "proto-gaming" with a group of like-minded science fiction fans including fellow linguist Bill Shipley and Victor Golla, producing elaborate documents to support the exploration of that shared world.

Having watched the Dungeons & Dragons games started by Mike Mornard, one of the original testers for D&D, when he moved to Minneapolis from Lake Geneva, Wisconsin, Barker resolved to create his own ruleset based on his own created world and the game mechanics from D&D. After six weeks, this was self-published in August 1974 as Empire of the Petal Throne and play commenced forthwith, including such occasional members as Dave Arneson – who singled out Barker and Tékumel as being his favorite Dungeon Master and roleplaying game, respectively – from early days.

Once Gary Gygax's attention had been drawn to Barker's work, it was decided that TSR would publish a revised version of the game mechanics along with a condensed version of his campaign setting. TSR's Empire of the Petal Throne was published in 1975 for Gen Con VIII, making it TSR's third role-playing game to be published. In a December 1976 editorial for The Dragon magazine, editor Tim Kask drew comparisons between the world of Tékumel and J. R. R. Tolkien's Middle-earth not in terms of literature created, nor that his work was derivative of Tolkien's, but rather regarding the in-depth detail in the setting, mythos and linguistic backgrounds and concluded that "In terms of development of detail, I think EPT [Empire of the Petal Throne] has it over Middle Earth in the matters that most concern gamers" since it had been developed by a "wargamer", whereas Tolkien had no such background and having died prior to the release of D&D was thus unable to address this new pastime personally.

Barker disliked the limited support given to the setting, and after 1977 he took his world of Tékumel from TSR and ultimately moved it on to a succession of additional publishers: Imperium Publishing (1978), Adventure Games (1981), Gamescience (1983–1984), Tékumel Games (1983–1986), Different Worlds Publications (1987–1988), TOME (1991–1994), Tita's House of Games (1997–2002), Zottola Publishing (2002–2003), and Guardians of Order (2005). Due to Dave Arneson's personal friendship with Barker, Adventures Games released several Tékumel-related books, including army lists, maps and other general reference material. Barker's RPG novel The Man of Gold (July 1984), set in Tékumel, was published by DAW.

Despite having had a head start on other in-depth campaign settings and seeing his game released no less than four times with various supplements and magazine articles, many which he contributed to, and having authored five books using the same setting, Barker's Tékumel in both roleplaying and literary domains is still well known to only a relatively small audience, leading German magazine Der Spiegel in 2009 to publish an article on Barker's life entitled "" ("The forgotten Tolkien"). The article quotes friends and acquaintances who posit that this may be, at least in part, due to the unfamiliarity of the setting compared with Western society, echoing Fine's observations from 1983, and possibly even that Tékumel was released to the gaming world too early on, when players had only just started to experiment with their own invented worlds rather than fitting their play into preconfigured, non-literary domains with novel backgrounds.

In 2008, Barker founded the Tékumel Foundation along with many of his long-time players "to support and protect the literary works and all related products and activities surrounding [his] world of Tékumel and the Empire of the Petal Throne." The Foundation acts as his literary executor.

Barker died in home hospice on March 16, 2012. He is survived by his wife, Ambereen.

Neo-Nazi/white supremacist work
Barker wrote a sixth novel, Serpent's Walk, under the pseudonym Randolph D. Calverhall (likely a play on "Randolph de Caverhall", a supposed ancestor). The novel was published in 1991 by National Vanguard Books, which published white supremacist and neo-Nazi material including The Turner Diaries.

Serpent's Walk features an alternate history where SS soldiers begin an underground resistance after the end of WWII, with their descendants rising up a century later to take over the United States of America with the "tactics of their enemies", "building their economic muscle and buying into the opinion-forming media". The back cover of the book states "The good guys win sometimes. Not always, of course. They lost big in the Second World War. That was a victory for communists, democrats, and Jews, but everyone else lost." It continues, "A century after the war they are ready to challenge the democrats and Jews for the hearts and minds of White Americans, who have begun to have their fill of government-enforced multi-culturalism and 'equality.'"

Between 1990 and 2002, Barker also served as a member of the Editorial Advisory Committee of the Journal of Historical Review, an advocate of Holocaust denial and revisionist pseudohistory.

In March 2022, the Tékumel Foundation confirmed Barker's authorship of Serpent's Walk and association with the Journal of Historical Review. The Foundation repudiated Barker's views in the novel, from which it does not receive royalties, and apologized for not acknowledging its authorship earlier.

Partial bibliography

Language texts
Barker studied various languages academically and helped author and co-author various publications relating to some of those, including the following:

Published by the University of California Press:

 Klamath Texts (1963)
 Klamath Dictionary (1963)
 Klamath Grammar (1964)

Published by the McGill University Institute of Islamic Studies:

 A Course in Urdu (1967)
 An Urdu Newspaper Reader (1968)
 A Reader of Modern Urdu Poetry (1968)
 A Course in Baluchi (1969)

Roleplaying
Tékumel has spawned five professionally published roleplaying games over the course of the years. It was also reportedly a major influence on other creations such as Hârn and the Skyrealms of Jorune.

 Empire of the Petal Throne (1975) as a boxed set by TSR, Inc. following earlier self-publication in 1974, and reprinted later as a single book by Different Worlds in 1987.
 Swords & Glory (1983/4) in two volumes by Gamescience.
 Gardásiyal: Adventures on Tékumel (1994) by Theatre of the Mind Enterprises; with Neil R. Cauley.
 Tekumel: Empire of the Petal Throne (2005) by Guardians of Order; by various, with M.A.R. Barker.
 Bethorm: The Plane of Tékumel (2014) by UNIGames; by Jeff Dee and M.A.R. Barker.

Novels
Barker wrote five novels set in the world of Tékumel - in chronological reading order these are:

 The Man of Gold (1984)
 Flamesong (1985)
 Lords of Tsámra (2003)
 Prince of Skulls (2002)
 A Death of Kings (2003)

Novels (non-Tékumel)

 Serpent's Walk (1991)

See also
Tsolyáni language

Notes and references

External links
Official Tékumel website
Brett Slocum's Tékumel Site (last updated 2013)
Tékumel Discussion Group - participants include Prof. Barker and regular players in his "Thursday Night Group"
 
Bibliography on SciFan
Bibliography on SFBookcase.com

1929 births
2012 deaths
20th-century American novelists
21st-century American novelists
American fantasy writers
Linguists from the United States
American male novelists
American neo-Nazis
American Muslims
Converts to Islam
Linguists of Klamath
Role-playing game designers
20th-century American male writers
21st-century American male writers
Constructed language creators
Fulbright alumni